Acusta despecta is a species of air-breathing land snail, a terrestrial pulmonate gastropod mollusc in the family Camaenidae.

This species is sometimes a pest on citrus trees.

Subspecies
 Acusta despecta chinensis
 Acusta despecta ikiensis (Pilsbry & Hirase, 1904)
 Acusta despecta kikaiensis (Pilsbry, 1902)
 Acusta despecta praetenuis (Pilsbry & Hirase, 1904)
 Acusta despecta sieboldtiana (Pfeiffer, 1850) - in Japanese: ウスカワマイマイ

Distribution
The distribution of this species includes:
 Japan
 Guam
 South Korea

References

External links 

Camaenidae
Gastropods described in 1839